Dhamala is a surname found in Nepal. Notable people with the surname include:

Rishi Dhamala (born 1964), Nepalese journalist
Sunil Dhamala (born 1997), Nepalese cricketer
Prahlad Dhamala (born 1999), IT specialist
Rhitika Dhamala (born 2004)

Nepali-language surnames
Surnames of Nepalese origin
Khas surnames